Rakesh Agrawal may refer to:

Rakesh Agrawal (chemical engineer), National Medal of Technology & Innovation Laureate; professor at Purdue University
Rakesh Agrawal (computer scientist), former Technical Fellow at the Microsoft Search Labs

See also 
Rakesh Aggarwal (born 1975), British businessman
Rakesh Aggarwal (gastroenterologist) (born 1961), Indian gastroenterologist